King Kelly of the U.S.A. is a 1934 American romantic musical film directed by Leonard Fields. The film stars then popular singer Guy Robertson in his only feature film appearance.

Plot
James W. Kelly (Guy Robertson) and his pal Happy Moran (Edgar Kennedy) are taking their all-girl-dancing troupe "Kelly's Affairs" across the ocean on the SS Île de France to tour Europe. Despite warning his troupe not to fall in love, Kelly and the mysterious Catherine Bell (Irene Ware), fall for each other, literally. Maxine sets her gold-digging sights on wealthy J. Ashton Brockton (Franklin Pangborn). Brockton sends his secretary to buy Maxine out of Kelly's Affairs, but Kelly refuses to break up the act.

When their backers pull out, Happy and Kelly are unable to manage to scrounge enough dough to get the girls back home. Brockton has also been informed of bad news; his high paid contract as an efficiency expert to the Kingdom of Belgardia is a bad move as the nation is broke. The scheming Brockton sees his chance to kill two birds with one stone; he swaps management of the entire troupe of Kelly's Affairs to get his girlfriend and for exchange gives Kelly his position in Belgardia where Kelly and Happy believe they will "live like kings".

Belgardia in a tiny Kingdom of 50,012 where the GDP is measured in mops. When King Maxmilian leaves his royal palace for a bicycle ride, he has his bicycle destroyed in a country ditch. He hitches a ride with Kelly and Happy who believe him a tramp, and make him act as their servant to impress the King. With the incognito King carrying their bags, the gates of the Royal Palace are opened to them.

The pair discover that Belgardia is broke, especially hard hit by the fact that no one is buying mops as they now use vacuum cleaners instead. Spying a pair of tourists offering to pay money to get inside the castle, Kelly has a brainstorm to open the nation to tourism and charge fees for touring, then opens the palace as an amusement park with mops as prizes. As a crooner, Kelly tries to sell mops by appealing to women's vanity, using a radio show to pull the kingdom out of bankruptcy, and win Catherine Bell, who is actually Princess Tania, from their shipboard romance.

Time is running out, as Prince Alexis, (William Orlamond), invades, from the neighbouring country of Moronia, to seize the castle and marry the Princess. Their only defence, as the army has quit for not being paid, are the women tourist customers and their “Personality Mops”.

Cast
Guy Robertson as James W. Kelly
Edgar Kennedy as Happy Moran
Irene Ware as Princess Tania aka Catherine Bell
Ferdinand Gottschalk as King Maxmilian of Belgardia
Franklin Pangborn as J. Ashton Brockton
Joyce Compton as Maxine Latour
Wilhelm von Brincken as Stranger
Otis Harlan as Prime Minister
William Orlamond as Prince Alexis
Bodil Rosing as Tania's Maid
Dick Curtis as Otto the Palace Guard 
Hattie McDaniel as the Black Narcissus Mop Buyer

Soundtrack
Guy Robertson - "Right Next Door to Love" (Music by Joe Sanders, lyrics by Bernie Grossman)
Guy Robertson - "Believe Me" (Music by Joe Sanders, lyrics by Bernie Grossman)
Guy Robertson and the marching mop ladies - "There's a Love Song in the Air" (Music by Joe Sanders, lyrics by Bernie Grossman)

References

External links

 
 
 

1934 films
1934 musical comedy films
1934 romantic comedy films
American musical comedy films
American romantic comedy films
American romantic musical films
American black-and-white films
Monogram Pictures films
Films set in Europe
Films directed by Leonard Fields
1930s American films